Irmãos Coragem is a Brazilian telenovela produced and broadcast by TV Globo. It premiered on 8 June 1970 and ended on 12 July 1971, with a total of 328 episodes. It's the ninth "novela das oito" to be aired on the timeslot. It is created and written by Janete Clair, and directed by Daniel Filho

Cast

References 

TV Globo telenovelas
1970 telenovelas
Brazilian telenovelas
1970 Brazilian television series debuts
1971 Brazilian television series endings
Portuguese-language telenovelas